Marusino is a rural locality (a village) in Arovsky Selsoviet, Chishminsky District, Bashkortostan, Russia. The population was 8 as of 2010. There are 2 streets.

Geography 
Marusino is located 19 km southeast of Chishmy (the district's administrative centre) by road. Babikovo is the nearest rural locality.

References 

Rural localities in Chishminsky District